Ignacy Mystkowski (February 4, 1826 – May 13, 1863) was a Polish nobleman, railroad engineer who became a commander of insurgent forces during the period of the January Uprising and was promoted to the rank of lieutenant-colonel. By birth, he was member of Mystkowski family.

Mystkowski studied engineering in France. As an engineer he worked on the railway transport of the Saint Petersburg–Warsaw Railway, donated for use in December 1862 and running through Malkinia.

During the January Uprising he commanded about 1,200 insurgents. Along with his soldiers, he defeated the Russians in the Battle of Stok in early May 1863 and was promoted to the rank of lieutenant-colonel. He died   on May 13, 1863 during the Battle of Kietlanka.

Bibliography  

 Stefan Kieniewicz, Powstanie styczniowe, Warsaw 1972; .
Cz. Vol. Brodzicki D. Godlewska, Lomza in the years 1794-1866. PWN, Warsaw 1987 rs 268. available at:  historialomzy.pl. (2014-01-19).
 , source detailing the events concerning Mystkowski's detachment during the events of the Uprising.
, biography of Ignatius Mystkowski.

Footnotes

Polish nobility
Clan of Jastrzębiec
1826 births
1863 deaths